Why War? may refer to:

 Why War? (organization), an anti-war organization founded in 2001 at Swarthmore College
 Why War? (paper), a 1933 paper co-authored by Albert Einstein and Sigmund Freud